The Golden Wings Flying Museum was an aviation museum located in Blaine, Minnesota.

History 
The museum was founded in 1996 by Greg Herrick in a former University of Minnesota hangar.

In 1997, Greg Herrick began a campaign to force the Federal Aviation Administration to make the blueprints of historic aircraft available to the public. This led to a lawsuit in 1999 that eventually resulted in the "Herrick Amendment" being passed as part of the FAA Air Transportation Modernization and Safety Improvement Act in 2012.

The collection was put up for sale in 2015.

Collection

Aircraft formerly on display 

 Aerocar
 Aeronca C-3
 Alliance A-1 Argo
 Arrow Sport M
 Avro Avian
 Boeing Stearman
 Buhl Sport Airsedan
 Bushmaster 2000
 Cunningham-Hall PT-6
 Fairchild FC-2W-2
 Fairchild PT-19A
 Fairchild PT-23
 Fairchild PT-26
 Fairchild PT-26
 Fleetwings Seabird
 Ford 4-AT-A Trimotor
 Interstate S-1A Cadet
 Kreutzer K-5 Air Coach
 Paramount Cabinaire
 Stearman C3B
 Stearman Model 6 Cloudboy
 Stinson SM-6000-A Airliner
 Stinson SM-6000-B Airliner
 Travel Air 6000-A
 Waco CUC-1

Aircraft formerly under restoration 

 Bellanca 31-42 Senior Pacemaker
 Call-Air A-2
 Curtiss Fledgling
 Fairchild 45
 Fairchild 22 C7D
 Fairchild KR-34C
 Frankfort TG-1A
 Keystone-Loening K-84
 Spartan C2-60
 Stinson SM-1 Detroiter
 Stinson SM-7A

See also 
 American Wings Air Museum

References

External links 

 
 Golden Wings Flying Museum – John2031.com

Aerospace museums in Minnesota
Blaine, Minnesota